The Boycott against Xiao Zhan Incident, also known as the 227 Incident, is a 2020 online controversy that originated between the fans of Chinese actor Xiao Zhan and Archive of Our Own users in Mainland China. The incident started when the internet censorship system known as the Great Firewall of China blocked the fan fiction publishing platform Archive of Our Own in the country, due to concerns about the actor's fanbase regarding vulgar and explicit content on the website.

Background 
On January 30, 2020, a user named "迪迪出逃记" from the fan fiction site Archive of Our Own began serializing a novel titled Falling (下坠), which focuses on Xiao Zhan and his fellow Chinese actor Wang Yibo. The two idol-actors initially starred as the leads in the popular TV series The Untamed (2019), which is based on the Boys' Love novel Mo Dao Zu Shi.

On February 24, links of the chapters 12 and 13 of the novel Falling (下坠) were posted by the author on the Chinese social networking site Weibo. On February 26, 2020, some of Xiao Zhan's fans claimed that the work contains explicit pornographic content and the feminization of Xiao Zhan, as sketched by users "一只汐哥哥" and "一个执白". Many fans took it as an insult to the actor, denouncing it on Weibo. Author "迪迪出逃记" and the graphic artists were the main targets of criticism. Users "来碗甜粥吗" and "巴南区小兔赞比", the "opinion leaders" among Xiao Zhan's fanbase, are recognized as the leaders of the reporting incident against the author and the graphic artists. In a Weibo post on February 26, user "巴南区小兔赞比" said that "actors and their fans" do not need to "accept vulgar underage prostitution literature based on artists" and "such behavior not only infringes on the artist's reputation, but also pollutes the online environment and brings down a large number of underaged fans who lack judgement". On February 29, 2020, Archive of Our Own was officially blocked in mainland China.

History

227 Incident 
The banning of Archive of Our Own in mainland China caused controversy among its users. Their criticisms were further amplified by controversial behaviors of some of Xiao Zhan's fans, and claimed that the actor should take responsibility for his fans' actions. A section of the site's users called for a protest on Xiao Zhan's brand deals and endorsed products, flooding the brand's pages with negative comments. They formed a Weibo supertopic group titled "227 (February 27) Memorial Day", referring to the incidents that occurred regarding the reporting of Xiao Zhan's fans in February 27. This led to increasing cyber violence towards Xiao Zhan, his fans, and even bystanders. This includes Chinese variety show host He Jiong, who was attacked by the group following a rumor that Xiao Zhan would be making an appearance on his show. Some accounts that led online attacks and harassment against the actor were labelled as paid, "professional" anti-fans.

Apology from Xiao Zhan Studio 
On March 1, 2020, Xiao Zhan's management "Xiao Zhan Studio" issued an apology on Weibo for taking up public resources during the COVID-19 period and for causing troubles to the public.

Boycott against Xiao Zhan-endorsed brands 
On March 17, 2020, many Chinese users of Archive of Our Own announced their boycott against the brands that Xiao Zhan endorses. These include international luxury brands Estée Lauder, Piaget, and Cartier.

Xiao Zhan's first interview since the 227 Incident 
On May 6, 2020, Xiao Zhan was interviewed by Economic View regarding the 227 Incident. He was, at the time, also faced cyber violence from internet users for controversial remarks made on Weibo during his college years. Xiao Zhan apologized for his old posts and expressed his confusion toward the incidents starting from February 27, 2020. He disagreed, however, with the view that idols need to be responsible for fan's behaviors as he noted idols and fans should be equal, and idols are not superiors to fans. He also said he would guide fans "by being a positive role model, and that he hoped they would live their lives well and won't do anything extreme that would hurt others or themselves."

Initiation of Criminal Case by Beijing City Chaoyang District Police Office 
On May 20, 2020, Xiao Zhan's attorney announced on Weibo that they have initiated a criminal case for "The Crime of Illegal Use of Information Network" for the violation of Xiao Zhan's rights, alongside the Beijing City Chaoyang District Police Offices.

Weibo's closing of accounts and pages 
On July 5, 2020, Weibo closed and banned some accounts of the 227 Incident group due to the cyber attacks on state agencies, central media, and interference with the normal operation of professional enterprises. Weibo stated that they provide interest and social functions for the production and consumption of content for various fields including celebrities and entertainment, but limited to the promotion of cyber violence on state agencies and official media organizations for interfering with the normal operations of enterprises, and acts suspected of breaking the law will be handled in accordance with community rules.

Xiao Zhan Studio's apology and cooperation with Weibo 
On July 14, 2020, Weibo posted regarding fan guidance and management. Weibo believed that influential public figures and celebrities have the obligation of guiding and restraining fan behavior mainly through official fan organizations. They contacted Xiao Zhan's management, Xiao Zhan Studio, and suggested that the actor's working team should strengthen the positive guidance and restraint ability of his fanbase, unofficial accounts, and organizations. Xiao Zhan Studio agreed with the suggestions made by Weibo and made it clear that they will actively cooperate and support the management of the platform on the issue of official and unofficial organizations. Weibo closed some unofficial accounts that were using Xiao Zhan's name to promote conflicts.

Following Weibo's announcement, Xiao Zhan Studio posted that they acknowledged their duties and expressed their apologies. Xiao Zhan Studio was initially established in hopes of creating better communication between Xiao Zhan and the public and to "share the actor's positive values to the society, but within 9 months of their establishment, they still have not reached their goals." They admitted their lack of fan guidance and lack of accurately responding to negative impressions that led to large-scale conflicts between groups and varying media, disturbing innocent people, and causing trouble for related departments and professional works. Xiao Zhan Studio also stated that they reject fights and insults, reject instigating oppositions between groups, reject irrational spending by minors and reject hurting others for any reason. They are also aware of their responsibility and duties and will "actively guide fans, calling for a stop to the promotion of hate and will cooperate with the platform to maintain a healthy online environment."

On July 17, 2020, Xiao Zhan studio once again called for fans' restraint and to follow their 4 main guidelines: (1) Don't participate in mass voting, mass commenting on social media, or do large fan support activities. (2) Don't fight or insult others or instigate and provoke group oppositions. (3) Buy endorsements and works based on everyone's financial ability (especially for minor fans to not overspend). (4) Focus on your school and work first, before paying attention to the artist's works in film and music. Xiao Zhan Studio also stated their hopes that everyone "can live their own lives well and think independently to be better people."

See also 

 Boycott
 Cyberbullying
 "Spotlight" (Xiao Zhan song)

References 

March 2020 events in China
February 2020 events in China
Sina Corp
Protests in China
Celebrity fandom
Internet censorship in China
Entertainment scandals
Fan fiction